Pasay Harbor City is a reclaimed area on Manila Bay. It is under the jurisdiction of Pasay, Philippines.

Background

The Pasay City Government entered into a contractual Joint Venture Agreement (JWA) with Pasay Harbor City Corporation (PHCC), a special purpose corporation that will engage in a 265-hectare land reclamation on the municipal waters of the city. It was approved by the Philippine Competition Commission on September 2019.

Pasay Harbor City Corporation is a partnership composed of Udenna Development Corporation, Ulticon Builders Inc., and China Harbour Engineering Company.

Development 
The proposed reclamation project, called the Pasay Harbour Reclamation Project, encompasses 265 hectares, including two (2) islands with respective areas of 210 (Island A) and 55 hectares (Island B).

Construction

As of July 19, 2022, about 117 hectares of land has been reclaimed. Horizontal developments, including roads, bridges, power, water, drainage, sewerage, communications and other utilities and facilities are targeted to be completed on 2028.

Royal Boskalis Westminster N.V. was in-charge of the dredging and land reclamation environment, after the proponents of Pasay Harbor City dropped their Chinese partner.

See also
 Land reclamation in Metro Manila
 Bay City
 Horizon Manila
 Manila Solar City
 Navotas Boulevard Business Park

References

External links
 Harbor City Philippines – Pasay Harbor City Corporation official website

Land reclamation in the Philippines
Manila Bay
Districts in Metro Manila
Mixed-use developments in Metro Manila
Planned communities in the Philippines